Peltigera leucophlebia is a lichenized fungus in the family Peltigeraceae.  It is commonly called ruffled freckled pelt.  This and other species in the genus contain a green algae in the genus Coccomyxa and also cyanobacteria in the genus Nostoc as symbionts.

Description
The thallus of this lichen is gray or brown, but when it is wet, the bright green algae are clearly visible.  The lower surface of the thallus is white.

Distribution
This species is found in North America, Asia, and Europe. In North America, it is found in most of Alaska and Canada, the Great Lakes region, New England, the Rocky Mountains, and the Pacific coast.

Ecology
Peltigera leucophlebia is a known host for the microfungus Pyrenidium actinellum.

Uses
In Iceland, Peltigera leucophlebia was traditionally used to make porridge.

Chemistry
Peltigera leucophlebia is known to contain tenuiorin, methylgyrophorate and gyrophoric acid. The thallus turns an ochre colour when performing during a K spot test.

Gallery

References

leucophlebia
Lichen species
Lichens described in 1860
Lichens of Asia
Lichens of Europe
Lichens of North America
Lichens of Iceland
Lichens of Canada
Fungi without expected TNC conservation status
Taxa named by William Nylander (botanist)